Miguel de Poblete Casasola or Miguel Millán de Poblete (1602 – December 8, 1667) was a Roman Catholic prelate who served as Bishop of Nicaragua (1640) and Archbishop of Manila (1649–1667).

Biography
Miguel de Poblete Casasola was born in Mexico City. In 1640, he resigned as Bishop of Nicaragua. On May 20, 1648, Pope Innocent X appointed him Archbishop of Manila. On January 1, 1649, he was confirmed to the position and on September 9, 1650, he was consecrated bishop by Juan de Mañozca y Zamora, Archbishop of Mexico. He served as Archbishop of Manila until his death on December 8, 1667. While bishop, he was the Principal Consecrator of Nicolás de la Torre Muñoz, Bishop of Santiago de Cuba (1651); and Rodrigo Cárdenas, Bishop of Nueva Segovia (1651).

His nephew was José Millán de Poblete, Bishop-elect of Nueva Segovia.

References

External links and additional sources
 (for Chronology of Bishops) 
 (for Chronology of Bishops) 
 (for Chronology of Bishops) 
 (for Chronology of Bishops) 

1602 births
1667 deaths
17th-century Roman Catholic archbishops in the Philippines
Bishops appointed by Pope Innocent X
17th-century Roman Catholic bishops in Nicaragua
Roman Catholic bishops of León in Nicaragua

Roman Catholic Archdiocese of Manila